Alkana may be:
the surname of:
 Antonio Alkana, South African athlete
a misspelling for:
 Alkanna, a genus of plants
 Alkane, a class of chemical compounds
 Alcanar, a city in Spain